Elections to Rotherham Metropolitan Borough Council were held on 7 May 1998.  One third of the council was up for election and the Labour party kept overall control of the council.

After the election, the composition of the council was
Labour 65
Conservative 1

Election result

References

1998 English local elections
1998
1990s in South Yorkshire